Gebel al-Ain is a plateau in Sudan at the border between the Northern state and North Kurdufan.

The Gebel al-Ain area is more fertile than the surrounding dry savannah, making it a popular grazing ground for the Kababish-nomads dwelling around it.

Around the Gebel al-Ain many archaeological sites are situated, mostly graveyards of the post-Meroitic and medieval Christian period. The most prominent archaeological sites are a ruined monastery in the west of the mountain - the south-westernmost outpost of the Makurian state known so far - and a settlement of round huts with a surrounding wall close to Bir al-Ain southwest of the main top of the mountain.

References 

Al-Ain
History of Nubia
Archaeological sites in Sudan